Blanchard is an unincorporated community in Mariposa and Tuolumne Counties, California.

A post office operated at Blanchard from 1894 to 1953, moving in 1938. The name honored Rosie M. Blanchard, its first postmaster.

References

Unincorporated communities in Tuolumne County, California
Unincorporated communities in Mariposa County, California
Unincorporated communities in California